Robert Ayton may refer to:

Robert Aytoun (1570–1638), Scottish poet
Robert Ayton (artist) (1915–1985), illustrator for the Eagle comic and Ladybird Books